Huancané can refer to a city, a district and a province in Peru.

For the use of the term in a specific setting, see:

Huancané for the town in Peru.
Huancané District for the district in the Huancané province.
Huancané Province for the province in Puno.